The Kidney Federation of India (Malayalam: കിഡ്‌നി ഫെഡറേഷന്‍ ഇന്ത്യ KFI) is a non-government charitable foundation working for patients with renal problems, located in Thrissur city of Kerala, India. It was founded by a Syro-Malabar Catholic Church priest,  Davis Chiramel.

History
Chiramel donated his kidney on 30 September to Gopinathan Chakkamadathil, an electrician who lives in Vadanappilly, Thrissur District. From his experience, he started the foundation in Thrissur city for the treatment of kidney failure. The KFI has opened a dialysis facility with ten machines in Thrissur and offers treatment for its members at a maximum of Rs300 per session.

Kochouseph Chittilappilly, the owner and founder of V-Guard Industries Ltd, was the first donor to the Kidney Federation of India, when he donated his kidney to truck driver Joy John, a native of Kottayam District.

References

Health charities in India
Organisations based in Thrissur
2009 establishments in Kerala
Organizations established in 2009